Danetre and Southbrook Learning Village (DSLV) is an academy school and sixth form for pupils aged 3 to 19, located in Daventry, Northamptonshire, England.

DSLV was formed from the merger of Danetre School, Southbrook Infant and Nursery School and Southbrook Junior School in September 2012.  The academy is 1 of 28 sponsored by E-ACT.

Academy Leadership Team

The Headteacher Primary is Mrs Joanne Cadd. 

The Headteacher Secondary is Sarah Hadlow.

The Senior Deputy Headteacher Secondary is Mrs Beverley Maughan.

The Deputy Headteacher Primary is Mrs Hannah Rowe.

The Deputy Headteacher Secondary is Mr Kieron Bailey.

The Assistant Headteacher (KS2) Primary is Melanie Payne.

The Assistant Headteacher Secondary is Mr Mark Franzoni.

The Assistant Headteacher Secondary is Mrs Emma Dunkley.

The Assistant Headteacher Secondary is Mr Phillip Hopkins.

References

External links

Secondary schools in West Northamptonshire District
Primary schools in West Northamptonshire District
Academies in West Northamptonshire District
E-ACT
Daventry
Educational institutions established in 2012
2012 establishments in England